Medcalf is a surname. Notable people with the surname include:

Francis Henry Medcalf (1803–1880), Canadian politician
Ian Medcalf (1918–2011), Australian politician
James Medcalf (1895–1980), English footballer
J. T. Medcalf (1843–1899), American politician
Kim Medcalf (born 1973), British actress and singer
Robert Medcalf (1887–1963), Australian politician
Stephen Medcalf (1936–2007), British academic
Stephen Medcalf (director) (born 1958), British stage director